Lindemann is a German musical project fronted by vocalist Till Lindemann. It was formed in 2013 as a super-duo alongside Swedish multi-instrumentalist Peter Tägtgren. Tägtgren originally defined their sound as a cross between his project Pain and Lindemann's main band Rammstein, adding "at least it's a mix of Rammstein vocals and Pain music." Together, they released the two albums Skills in Pills (2015) and F & M (2019). Tägtgren departed Lindemann in 2020, leaving  Lindemann as a solo project.

History

Origins and Skills in Pills (2013–2016) 

Lindemann and Tägtgren met around the year 2000 in a rock pub in Stockholm, when members of Clawfinger introduced them to each other. In 2013, when Rammstein was headlining a festival in Sweden, the German singer invited his Swedish bandmate to it. There, he told Tägtgren he would take two years off and wanted to write some music with him. They originally planned to do only one or two songs, but Tägtgren felt they were "too good" and wanted to write more.

The name of the band "was the only thing we couldn't come up with". All names considered by the band were already taken by other groups, so they eventually accepted a suggestion by somebody else and simply called it "Lindemann", though Tägtgren was initially unhappy with it.

On 28 May 2015, the band released its debut single "Praise Abort". Their debut studio album titled Skills in Pills was released on 19 June 2015. When asked about possible future live performances, Tägtgren said it will depend on fan response to the project. In November 2016, Pain's Facebook page teased that a concert would be happening on 9 November. Lindemann joined Tägtgren on stage to sing "Praise Abort".

F & M and departure of Tägtgren, Live In Moscow  (2018–2021) 

In 2018, the duo made music for an adaptation of the play "Hänsel und Gretel" with Till Lindemann also appearing in the play. Also in September, Lindemann and Tägtgren announced a tour of Russia, Ukraine and Kazakhstan in support of Lindemann's book "Messer".
On the next without any doubts the mysterious first band's concert took place in Kyiv 

On 16 August 2019, Peter Tägtgren announced that the new album was done, mixed and produced. On 10 September 2019, a teaser for the new single "Steh auf" was posted on social media telling the music video be released on 13 September 2019. The music video featured Swedish actor Peter Stormare. The album F & M was released on 22 November 2019. Lindemann announced their 2020 tour on 4 November 2019 via their social media platforms.
The band toured in February and March 2020, but the tour was cut short due to the pandemic.

In November 2020, the duo announced that they would no longer be recording music together. Their final release together will be a concert film release of their 2020 show in Moscow. Till Lindemann planned to continue recording in the future under the name "Till Lindemann" with a different lineup.

Ich hasse Kinder Tour (2022-23) 
In the beginning of 2022 Lindemann started a concert tour named "Ich hasse Kinder" with a new line-up: Jes Paige (guitar), Emily Ruvidich (guitar), Acey Slade (bass) and Joe Letz (drums). Upcoming tour dates were announced, but the tour was postponed due to COVID-19 pandemic. Concerts planned in Russia were cancelled in 2022 (presumably, due to the Russian invasion of Ukraine but that was not explicitly mentioned in the announcement).
The tour is fully postponed to 2023 excepting Russia

On 29 October it was announced through instagram stories that the whole tour is postponed for a year October 2023, excepting Russia (the two concerts planned in Russia were both cancelled).

Discography

Studio albums

Live albums

Singles

EPs 
 2015: Praise Abort (Remixes)

Music videos 
 2015 — "Praise Abort"
 2015 — "Fish On"
 2018 — "Mathematik" 
 2019 — "Steh auf"
 2019 — "Ich weiß es nicht"
 2019 — "Knebel"
 2019 — "Frau & Mann"
 2019 — "Ach so gern
 2020 — "Ach so gern (One Shot Video)"
 2020 — "Ach so gern (Pain Version)"
 2020 — "Ach so gern (Clemens Wijers Version)"
 2020 — "Ach so gern (Drago Baotić Version)"
 2020 — "Platz Eins"
 2021 — "Ich hasse Kinder"

Awards and nominations

Metal Hammer Awards (GER)

|-
| 2015 || Lindemann || Best German Band || 
|-
| 2015 || Skills in Pills || Best Debut Album ||

Notes

References

External links 
 
 

Industrial metal musical groups
Industrial rock musical groups
Musical groups established in 2013
Heavy metal supergroups
Warner Records artists
German industrial music groups
German heavy metal musical groups
Swedish heavy metal musical groups
Musical groups from Stockholm
Swedish musical duos
Heavy metal duos
2013 establishments in Germany